The Shusha Declaration, officially the Shusha Declaration on allied relations between the Republic of Azerbaijan and the Republic of Turkey, is a declaration on allied relations signed between Azerbaijan and Turkey on 15 June 2021.

History 

A joint declaration on allied relations was signed in Shusha on 15 June 2021, between President of Azerbaijan Ilham Aliyev and President of Turkey Recep Tayyip Erdogan as part of the latter’s official two-day visit to Azerbaijan.

Scope 
The declaration touched various issues in the political, economic, trade, culture, education, sport, and energy security sectors, the Southern Gas Corridor, cooperation in the field of defense industry, military cooperation and mutual military assistance, the so-called "Zangezur corridor", possibilities of cooperation within the framework of the proposed six-party platform (Azerbaijan, Armenia, Russia, Turkey, Iran, Georgia), and opening a Turkish consulate in Shusha.

Reactions 
   Armenian Foreign Ministry strongly condemned the signing of the declaration by Azerbaijani and Turkish presidents, as well as Erdogan's speech in National Assembly of Azerbaijan and the joint visit of Azerbaijani and Turkish presidents to "currently occupied city of Shushi of Artsakh Republic", considering it "a provocation against the security and peace in the region".

  Russia’s President's spokesperson Dmitry Peskov, commenting on Turkish President Recep Tayyip Erdogan’s statement on the possible establishment of a Turkish military base in Azerbaijan, said that “the deployment of military infrastructure by the [NATO] alliance countries near our borders is cause for our special attention as well as a reason for us to take steps to ensure our security and interests,” emphasizing that “regional players must not take actions containing any elements that could cause a rise in tensions.” The Russian Foreign Minister Sergey Lavrov also commented on the issue, by dismissing it as rumours.

See also 
 Azerbaijan–Turkey relations

Notes

References

External links 
 Full text of the document 
 Full text of the document 

History of Shusha
Military alliances involving Azerbaijan
Military alliances involving Turkey
Azerbaijan–Turkey relations
Aftermath of the 2020 Nagorno-Karabakh war
2021 in Azerbaijan
2021 in Turkey
Treaties of Azerbaijan
Treaties of Turkey